Antonín Langweil (13 June 13 1791 in Postoloprty – 11 June 1837 in Prague) was a Bohemian lithographer, librarian, painter, and model maker. He created a model of the city of Prague, which is now on display at the City of Prague Museum.

References

Czech artists
1791 births
1837 deaths
People from Postoloprty